Milko Kelemen (30 March 1924 – 8 March 2018) was a Croatian composer.

Life 
Milko Kelemen was born in Slatina, Croatia (then Kingdom of Serbs, Croats and Slovenes). He studied under Stjepan Šulek in Zagreb, under Olivier Messiaen in Paris and Wolfgang Fortner in Freiburg amongst others.

Kelemen founded the Music Biennale Zagreb, an international contemporary music festival and served as its president from 1961 to 1979.

He also worked at the Electronic Siemens Studio in Munich and was invited to Berlin as Composer in Residence.

Kelemen was a recipient of many awards, most notably the Federal Cross of Merit, the prize of the ISCM, the Great Yugoslav State Prize, and the French order Chevalier des Arts et des Lettres.

He spent the last part of his life in Stuttgart, Germany, where he died. His works are published by Hans Sikorski Music Publishers.

Selected works 
Three Dances for viola and string orchestra (1958)
Composé for two pianos and orchestral group (1967)
Phantasmen for viola and orchestra (1985)
Archetypon II – Für Anton for large orchestra (1995)

References

1924 births
2018 deaths
Academy of Music, University of Zagreb alumni
Croatian composers
Croatian expatriates in Germany
Vladimir Nazor Award winners
Commanders Crosses of the Order of Merit of the Federal Republic of Germany
Pupils of Karlheinz Stockhausen
People from Slatina, Croatia